Aycan Yanaç (sometimes spelt Eidschan Janatsch; born 21 November 1998) is a German-born Turkish footballer, who plays as a forward for the Gaziantep-based ALG Spor in the Turkish Women's First League and for the Turkey women's national team.

Private life
Yanaç was born to Turkish immigrant parents in Nuremberg, Bavaria, Germany on 21 November 1998.

Club career
Yanac plays in the forward position. In July 2015, Yanac transferred from 1. FC Nürnberg to the club SpVgg Greuther Fürth playing in the  Frauen-Regionalliga Süd (Women's Regional League South). She played eleven matches in two seasons 2014–15 and 2015–16, and scored three goals. In December of the same year, she returned her previous club. Currently, she is with 1. FC Nürnberg II playing in the "Frauen Landesliga Nord – Bayern" (Women's States League North – Bavaria).

By August 2020, she moved to Turkey, and signed with the Gaziantep-based club ALG Spor, which are to play in the first qualifying round of the 2020–21 UEFA Women's Champions League.

International career
Yanaç was admitted to the Turkey women's national U-19 team, and played for the first time at the UEFA Development Tournament match against Bosnia and Herzegovina on 4 August 2015. She took part in two matches of the 2016 UEFA Women's Under-19 Championship qualification – Group 4. She capped seven times in total.

She was called up to the Turkey women's national team debuting in the friendly match against Estonia on 7 April 2018.

Reality show participation
In 2020, she participated in the celebrities team of the reality show Survivor Turkey 7th Celebrities vs Volunteers, where she was eliminated on day 109.

References

External links

1998 births
Living people
Citizens of Turkey through descent
Turkish women's footballers
Women's association football forwards
Turkey women's international footballers
Survivor Turkey contestants
Footballers from Nuremberg
German women's footballers
German people of Turkish descent
ALG Spor players